Limbo is a poem written by Samuel Taylor Coleridge. Most of its text was published posthumously.

References

British poems
Works by Samuel Taylor Coleridge